Thomas Fane, 8th Earl of Westmorland (March 1701 – 25 November 1771) was a British MP for Lyme Regis and a lord commissioner of trade. He was an ancestor of the writer George Orwell.

Biography

Thomas Fane was the second son of Henry Fane of Brympton d'Evercy in Somerset and Anne Scrope, sister and coheir of John Scrope. Anne and John were the grandchildren of Colonel Adrian Scrope, a regicide of Charles I. Thomas Fane inherited John Scrope's fortune and mansion in Bristol, and Colonel Adrian Scrope's property in Oxfordshire and Buckinghamshire, which included Wormsley Park.

In 1757 he succeeded his unmarried elder brother Francis to their father's Brympton estate and in 1762 inherited the title of Earl of Westmoreland from John Fane, 7th Earl of Westmorland, his father's childless second-cousin. This brought him the Earls of Westmorland seat at Apethorpe Hall in Northamptonshire.

In 1727 Thomas Fane married Elizabeth Swymmer, the daughter of a Bristol merchant and member of the slave trade, William Swymmer. The couple had two sons and two daughters, including:
John Fane, 9th Earl of Westmorland (1728–1774)
Henry Fane (1739–1802)
Mary, who married Charles Blair, of Whatcomb, Dorset. Charles Blair was the great-great-grandfather of Eric Arthur Blair, who wrote under the pen name George Orwell.

Mr Fane
In 1761 Joshua Reynolds painted his full-length portrait entitled Mr Fane. Reynolds was paid 80 guineas for the work, which depicted the powder-wigged subject walking through a wooded landscape wearing rose-coloured velvet attire. In May 1903 the portrait was sold to Martin Colnaghi for 2,100 guineas.

Notes

References

Attribution

1701 births
1771 deaths
18th-century English nobility
Fane, Thomas
Thomas
British MPs 1754–1761
British MPs 1761–1768
Earls of Westmorland
Barons Burghersh